The UST Growling Tigers are the college athletic teams representing the University of Santo Tomas in the University Athletic Association of the Philippines. They hold the most UAAP Overall Championships with 44 Seniors' Overall Championships (out of 73 seasons) and 21 Juniors' Overall Championships (out of 26 seasons).

UST is one of four member universities that participate in all 15 sporting events of the league. They also take part in various sports leagues such as the Filoil Flying V Preseason Cup, the Premier Volleyball League and the UNIGAMES.

Team identity

Mascot and colors

The gold and white colors of the flag of Vatican City were adopted by the University of Santo Tomas for their school colors because of its Pontifical status.

They were known as the Glowing Goldies until a name change in 1992. UST Rector Fr. Rolando V. de la Rosa, who was appointed in 1991 recalled in a speech to the school's administrators and faculty members during his 2007 Rector's Report on how UST's present Growling Tigers moniker came to be.

It was during the parade of school mascots in the opening ceremonies of Season 54 (1991–92) when an embarrassing incident occurred. Unlike the other member schools, UST had no mascot to represent their varsity teams and it gave the host school a hard time in coming up with a suitable representation for the Glowing Goldies. A “fat Dominican friar” who was carrying bags of gold had come out with the other mascots and drew a lot of laughter from the crowd in attendance.

Fr. De la Rosa later instructed PE moderator Bro. Rolando Atienza to conduct a naming activity for a new mascot. Mrs. Felicitas Francisco, directress of the PE department, suggested the tiger as the new mascot due to its gold and white colors.

When it was UST's turn to be host in Season 55 (1992–93), the new growling tiger mascot debuted in the opening ceremonies. Since then, Mrs. Francisco always donned her tiger-striped coat when she attends UST playoff games. The High School boys' team followed suit by changing their name from the "Golden Nuggets" to the "Tiger Cubs".

The Manila Central University Purple Owls once used the tiger mascot (with purple and gold colors) when they participated in the UAAP from 1952 until their pullout in 1962.

Varsity team monikers
The names of the University of Santo Tomas collegiate varsity teams that participate in the 15 UAAP sporting events are shown in the table below.

Basketball 

The UST men's and boys' basketball teams were first formed in the year of the NCAA's foundation in 1924. UST won their first and only NCAA men's championship in 1930.

In the UAAP, they have the most combined championships with 40 from the men's, women's and boys' teams. The men's total of 18 titles is tied with the UE Red Warriors' for the second most championships behind FEU's 20.

In 1993 the Growling Tigers finished the double-round eliminations with a rare 14–0 sweep and were declared automatic champions of the UAAP Season 56 men's tournament. This was the start of the Growling Tigers' four-peat championship run in the UAAP. The Tigers faced and defeated the De La Salle Green Archers for three consecutive finals series.

UST's last championship before the sweep was in 1967 when they were declared co-champions with UE in Season 30.

The Tiger Cubs and the Tigresses also have successful basketball programs with each team having a total of 11 UAAP championships.

In 1994, the men's, women's and juniors' teams won the UAAP Season 57 basketball championship in their respective divisions. This was the only time that a triple championship was achieved in the UAAP. UST also won double championships in Seasons 58 and 69 with the Growling Tigers and the Tigresses winning both their division titles in both years.

UST's off-season training includes participation in summer basketball tournaments. The Tiger Cubs regularly join the MILCU Summer Showcase, Smart City HOOPS, Filoil Flying V Preseason Cup juniors tournament and the PCABL Freego Cup. The Tigresses recently played in the Fr. Martin Cup Summer tournament and Breakdown Basketball Invitational tournament, while the Growling Tigers continue to participate in the MILCU Under-25 tournaments, the PBA D-League, Filoil Flying V Preseason Cup, Breakdown Basketball Invitational, Fr. Martin Cup Summer tournament, the Millennium Open Basketball championship, as well as pocket tournaments in the provinces such as the Kim Lope Asis Invitational Basketball Tournament in Bayugan, the Kadayawan Basketball Invitational in Davao City, and the Republica Cup collegiate tournament in Malolos. They have also competed in the Philippine Collegiate Champions League, an annual postseason tournament for schools that topped their respective leagues.

The UST Tigress Cubs girls' basketball team were declared co-champions with Adamson in Season 82's inaugural exhibition tournament after the deciding Game three of their finals series was cancelled due to the COVID-19 pandemic. The Tigresses finished second in the four-team eliminations with 4 wins and 2 losses behind the Lady Falcons' perfect 6–0 record.

UAAP seasons

Other tournaments 

Men
 1930 NCAA Season 7 – Champions
 2003 Philippine Collegiate Champions' League – 3rd place
 2004 Home and Away Invitational League – Runners-up
 2012 Philippine Collegiate Champions' League – Champions
 2014 Fr. Martin Cup Summer tournament – Runners-up
 2015 Fr. Martin Cup Summer tournament – Runners-up
 2017 32nd Kadayawan Basketball Invitational – Champions
 2017 7th Kim Lope Asis Invitational tournament – Runners-up
 2017 Republica Cup Basketball tournament – Runners-up
 2018 33rd Kadayawan Basketball Invitational – Runners-up
 2018 8th Kim Lope Asis Invitational tournament – Champions
 2019 NBA China 5v5 Grand Finals – Runners-up

Women
 2002 Women's Basketball League – Champions
 2003 Women's Basketball League – Champions
 2004 Women's Basketball League – Champions
 2005 Home and Away Invitational League – Runners-up
 2005 Women's Basketball League – Champions
 2006 Women's Basketball League – Champions
 2013 UNIGAMES – Champions
 2019 Fr. Martin Cup Summer tournament – Runners-up
 2019 Breakdown Basketball Invitational Summer Cup – Runners-up
Boys
 1989 National Secondary Title – Champions
 2017 MILCU x Got Skills Hard to Guard U17 tournament – Champions
 2019 12th PCABL Freego Cup – Runners-up

Notable players

3x3 basketball 
The 3x3 basketball competition was introduced in Season 80 as a demonstration sport.  UST did not join the men's inaugural contest, but the Growling Tigresses composed of Jhenn Angeles, Angel Anies, Karla Manuel and Carol Sangalang placed third behind the Adamson Lady Falcons and champions NU Lady Bulldogs.

In its second year, the UST Growling Tigers ended up tied with the UP Fighting Maroons and the De La Salle Green Archers at 3 wins and 3 losses behind the undefeated Ateneo Blue Eagles. They were represented by Renzo Subido, Soulémane Chabi Yo, Dave Ando and Rhenz Abando. The women's team of Sai Larosa, Tantoy Ferrer, Lon Rivera and Carol Sangalang also tied UE and Adamson's 4–3 record behind the undefeated and defending champions, the NU Lady Bulldogs.

Beginning in Season 82, the 3x3 competition is set to become an official tournament in the UAAP. The sport, with the participation of all eight UAAP schools will begin in March 2020.

Volleyball 

The UST Tiger Spikers have 19 UAAP men's volleyball championships, while the Golden Tigresses have 16 women's volleyball crowns and the Junior Tigresses have six girls' volleyball titles. The Tigresses were champions for seven consecutive years from Seasons 47 thru 53, while both the men's and girls' teams achieved a three-peat in Seasons 70, 71 and 72. The Junior Tiger Spikers have one UAAP crown which they won in Season 80.

The Tiger Spikers also participate in the Spikers' Turf, a preseason league where they finished second in the 2018 Collegiate Conference and third on two occasions in 2016 and 2017. The Golden Tigresses have had better success in the women's preseason tournaments, having won the most titles among collegiate teams in the Premier Volleyball League with six, beginning at the inaugural tournament in 2004 when the league was still known as the Shakey's V-League. The Junior Tigresses have won four championships in the Shakey's Girls' Volleyball League.

The men's team were back-to-back UNIGAMES champions in 2016 and 2017, while the Tigresses have a total of six volleyball championships, beginning in 2009 and capped by a three-peat from 2016 until 2018.

UAAP seasons

Other tournaments 

Men
 1989 PAVA National Collegiate – Champions
 2008 UNIGAMES – Champions
 2009 UNIGAMES – Champions
 2011 UNIGAMES – Runners-up
 2012 UNIGAMES – 3rd place
 2016 Spikers' Turf Collegiate Conference – 3rd place
 2017 PVL Collegiate Conference – 3rd place
 2017 UNIGAMES – Champions
 2018 UNIGAMES – Champions
 2018 PVL Collegiate Conference – Runners-up
Girls
 2009 Shakey's G-League – Champions
 2013 Shakey's G-League – Runners-up
 2015 Toby's Sports-Wilson Volleyball League – Champions
 2016 Shakey's G-League – Champions

Women
 1985 PAVA National Collegiate – Champions
 1986 PAVA National Collegiate – Champions
 1987 PAVA National Collegiate – Champions
 1988 PAVA National Collegiate – Champions
 1989 PAVA National Collegiate – Champions
 2004 Shakey's V-League 1st Conference – Champions
 2007 Shakey's V-League 1st Conference – Champions
 2007 Shakey's V-League 2nd Conference – Champions
 2008 UNIGAMES – 3rd place
 2009 Shakey's V-League 1st Conference – Champions
 2009 Shakey's V-League 2nd Conference – Champions
 2009 UNIGAMES – Champions
 2010 Shakey's V-League 1st Conference – Champions
 2010 UNIGAMES – Champions
 2013 UNIGAMES – Champions
 2016 UNIGAMES – Champions
 2017 UNIGAMES – Champions
 2018 UNIGAMES – Champions
 2019 UNIGAMES – 3rd place

Notable players

Beach volleyball 
The UAAP beach volleyball competition was introduced as a demonstration sport in Season 69 and was made into an official sport in Season 72. The UST Tiger Sands men's team who were formerly called the Tiger Spikers won the tournament in Season 71, while the women's team had two unofficial third place finishes in Seasons 69 and 71.

The Lady Spikers won their first championship in Season 74 after defeating Ateneo in the finals. In 2014, Cherry Rondina and Rica Rivera won the Season 77 championship in their rookie year. The Lady Spikers were defeated by Adamson the previous year. Rondina, who was named MVP that year went on to win three more championships and the same number of MVP awards until Season 81.

The Lady Spikers made history by winning their fourth-straight UAAP beach volleyball championship in Season 82. They hold the most UAAP titles won with seven. They won back-to-back championships in 2011 and 2012 and then they went on to achieve a four-peat from 2016 to 2019 with an undefeated 27–0 win–loss record.

The Tiger Sands have a total of five championships, having won back-to-back in Seasons 81 and 82.

UAAP seasons

Other tournaments 

Men
 2008 UNIGAMES – Runners-up
 2017 Beach Volleyball Republic Invitational – Champions
 2018 Beach Volleyball Republic on Tour Manila Open – Champions
 2019 Rebisco Beach Volleyball Open tournament – Champions

Women
 2012 Ibalong Festival Beach Volleyball Open Conference – Champions
 2013 Ibalong Festival Beach Volleyball Open Conference – Champions
 2013 Nestea Beach Intercollegiate competition – Runners-up
 2014 Ibalong Festival Beach Volleyball Open Conference – Champions
 2015 Ibalong Festival Beach Volleyball Open Conference – Champions
 2015 Nestea Beach Volleyball Intercollegiate competition – Champions
 2016 Nestea Beach Volleyball Intercollegiate competition – Champions
 2017 Beach Volleyball Republic Women's Collegiate, Bracket A – Champions
 2018 UNIGAMES – Champions
 2018 Beach Volleyball Republic on Tour Manila Open – Champions
 2019 Beach Volleyball Republic on Tour Dumaguete Open – Champions
 2019 Ibalong National Beach Volleyball Open Invitational – Champions
 2019 UNIGAMES – Champions

Notable players

Football 

The formation of UST's football team dates back to the early days of the NCAA. The Golden Booters have a combined total of 35 NCAA and UAAP championships. They won four straight NCAA titles from 1926 until 1929. The men's team who were sparringly called the Growling Booters and the Tiger Booters achieved a three-peat in the UAAP from 1991 to 1993. They last won the championship in 2006.

The Golden Booters made it back to the finals and ended up as runners-up to the undefeated UP Maroon Booters in Season 80. Before Season 77, UST had only missed the playoffs once in a span of 13 years.

The UST Lady Booters won their first UAAP title in 2009, 14 years after women's football became an official sport in the league. They won the championship again in 2011.

The Juniors team that plays in a small pool of four teams (the number of competing schools increased to five with the entry of Nazareth School in Season 80) have yet to get a podium finish since boys' football became a regular sport in UAAP Season 72.

UST's off-season training includes participation in the UNIGAMES, Ang Liga, the PFF Women's League, the Pinas Cup, and the Metro Manila Girls Football Association.

UAAP seasons

Other tournaments 

Men
 1926 NCAA Season 3 – Champions
 1927 NCAA Season 4 – Champions
 1928 NCAA Season 5 – Champions
 1929 NCAA Season 6 – Champions
 2004 Ang Liga – Runners-up
 2016 Ang Liga Season 14 Division 1 – Champions
 2017 Pinas Cup Men's Open – Champions
 2018 Pinas Cup Men's Open – Champions
 2018 Ang Liga Season 16 – Champions
 2019 Mayor Braeden John Q. Biron Collegiate Invitational – Champions

Women
 2001 Metro Manila Girls Football Association – Champions
 2002 Kick Sand Beach Football Open tournament – Champions
 2002 Chris Monfort Memorial Cup – 3rd place
 2003 1st Brent Invitational Football tournament – Champions
 2003 Globe Gentxt Beach Football National finals – Champions
 2003 Metro Manila Girls Football Association – 3rd place
 2004 Metro Manila Girls Football Association – 3rd place
 2004 UNIGAMES – Runners-up
 2007 1st PFL–Ang Liga Filipina Football – Runners-up
 2009 Rexona Cup – Champions
 2009 Metro Manila Girls Football Association – Champions
 2009 UNIGAMES – Champions
 2011 UNIGAMES – Runners-up
 2013 UNIGAMES – Runners-up
 2013 Pinay Futbol League – Champions
 2014 PFF Open Women's Cup – 3rd place
 2017 Philippine Football Federation Women's League – Runners-up
 2018 Philippine Football Federation Women's League – Runners-up
 2019 Philippine Football Federation Women's League – Runners-up

Notable players 

 
Rookie of the year awardees

Judo 
The UST Lady Judokas team, headed by Head Coach Gerald Arce is the defending champion of the UAAP Women's Judo competition. The Lady Judokas won five titles in the 6 seasons, having first won in Seasons 73, 74, and 75. After they suffered a 4th-place finish in Season 76, they bounced-back and became the back-to-back champions of the UAAP from Seasons 77 and 78.

Cheerdance 

The official Pep Squad and Drumline, the UST Yellow Jackets, and the official dance troupe, the UST Salinggawi Dance Troupe have won the UAAP Cheerdance Competition a league-leading eight times and holds the record for the longest championship run for five consecutive years (2002 to 2006). Their closest rival is the UP Pep Squad, which has been a consistent runner-up until 2007 when they snatched the title by a very thin margin from the Salinggawi Dance Troupe, which finished second.

See also 
 UST Salinggawi Dance Troupe
 UST Growling Tigers men's basketball
 UST Golden Tigresses women's volleyball
 UST Yellow Jackets
 UAAP Overall Championship

References 

Growing Tigers
University Athletic Association of the Philippines teams
College sports teams in Metro Manila
Former National Collegiate Athletic Association (Philippines) teams